Fornever is the fourth collaboration album by rapper Murs & producer 9th Wonder, released on April 13, 2010 on SMC Recordings.

Track listing

References

External links
 
 Murs & 9th Wonder, "Fornever" by Billboard

2010 albums
Murs (rapper) albums
9th Wonder albums
Albums produced by 9th Wonder
SMC Recordings albums